Antonio de Caro (died 1517) was a Roman Catholic prelate who served as Bishop of Nardò (1507–1517) and Bishop of Avellino e Frigento (1505–1507).

Biography
In 1505, Antonio de Caro was appointed during the papacy of Pope Julius II as Bishop of Avellino e Frigento. On 27 October 1507, he was appointed during the papacy of Pope Julius II as Bishop of Nardò. He served as Bishop of Nardò until his death in 1517.

References

External links and additional sources
 (for Chronology of Bishops) 
 (for Chronology of Bishops) 
 (for Chronology of Bishops) 
(for Chronology of Bishops) 

16th-century Italian Roman Catholic bishops
Bishops appointed by Pope Julius II
1517 deaths